Joseph Mukuku Akhasamba (born June 20, 1963, in Nairobi) is a Kenyan retired professional boxer who held the African heavyweight title from 1998 to 1999. As an amateur, he represented his native country at two consecutive Summer Olympics, starting in 1988. He won the gold medal in the men's light heavyweight division (– 81 kg) at the 1990 Commonwealth Games in Auckland, New Zealand.

References

External links
 

1963 births
Living people
Kenyan male boxers
Boxers at the 1988 Summer Olympics
Boxers at the 1992 Summer Olympics
Olympic boxers of Kenya
Heavyweight boxers
Light-heavyweight boxers
Boxers at the 1990 Commonwealth Games
Commonwealth Games gold medallists for Kenya
Commonwealth Games medallists in boxing
African Boxing Union champions
Sportspeople from Nairobi
21st-century Kenyan people
20th-century Kenyan people
Medallists at the 1990 Commonwealth Games